Kourabi Nenem is an I-Kiribati politician who served as the Vice President of Kiribati from March 2016 until May 2019

References

Year of birth missing (living people)
Living people
Members of the House of Assembly (Kiribati)
Vice-presidents of Kiribati
Government ministers of Kiribati
21st-century I-Kiribati politicians